Cordites pubescens is a species of beetle in the family Cerambycidae. It was described by James Thomson in 1868, originally under the genus Apamauta. It is known from Brazil.

References

Onciderini
Beetles described in 1868